was a Japanese politician. Fujita was born and brought up in Hiroshima City. He graduated from Waseda University in 1944.
During his 30-year political career, he served in some important posts such as the Director General of Okinawa Development Agency (1976-1977) and the President of the House of Councillors (1986-1988). He received the Grand Cordon of the Order of the Rising Sun in 1992.

References 

Members of the House of Councillors (Japan)
Liberal Democratic Party (Japan) politicians
20th-century Japanese politicians
Japanese football chairmen and investors
Grand Cordons of the Order of the Rising Sun
Waseda University alumni
People from Hiroshima
Politicians from Hiroshima Prefecture
1922 births
1996 deaths
Japanese sportsperson-politicians
Presidents of the House of Councillors (Japan)